R180 may refer to:
Dyn'Aéro R180, a French light aircraft design
R180 road (Ireland), a road in Ireland